The Oil Palace is a 6,960-seat multi-purpose arena located on Texas State Highway 64 just outside the eastern city limits of Tyler, Texas.

History
The Oil palace's story started in 1955 when Bobby Manziel, Sr. wanted to open a venue to host boxing matches. Manziel, a former amateur boxer, manager of boxer Buddy Turman, and close friend of World heavyweight Champion Jack Dempsey, was a successful businessman who dreamed of a 20,000 seat complex in East Texas. His vision would have been the only all-year air-conditioned stadium in the U.S. Dempsey even agreed to relocate and help manage the center. Unfortunately, Manziel died in 1956 and the 56,000 square-foot building's construction came to a halt. 
In 1981, Bobby Manziel, Jr. picked up where his father left off by converting the unfinished arena into what it is today. In November 1983, after years of remodeling, the construction was complete and thousands attended the opening ceremony to watch Barbara Mandrell perform.

On March 10, 2018, a $2 million renovation was unveiled for a concert starring Jamey Johnson.

External links
Official Oil Palace
 Oil Palace Myspace

References

Indoor arenas in Texas
Sports venues in Texas
Convention centers in Texas
Tyler, Texas
Buildings and structures in Smith County, Texas
1983 establishments in Texas
Sports venues completed in 1983
Event venues established in 1983